Converter may refer to:

Electromagnetics
Frequency converter
Voltage converter, another name for
Electromagnetic transformer
Switched-mode power supply
DC-to-DC converter
Power inverter (DC to AC)
Solar inverter

Electronics
Digital-to-analog converter
Analog-to-digital converter
 "Frequency-to-Voltage converter" (F-V converter), a frequency detector for voltage-controlled guitar synthesizer
 A combination local oscillator and mixer stage in a superheterodyne receiver
"Converter", an alternate name for a remote control

In television
Cable converter box, an electronic device use in cable television systems
Digital television adapter, sometimes known as a "converter box"

Information technology
Low-noise converter, in communications
Scan conversion between video formats
File format converter, for converting between various file formats
Currency converter, a piece of software for converting one currency into another

Metallurgy
Converter (metallurgy), a device for metallurgical smelting
Bessemer converter
Manhès-David converter
see also basic oxygen steelmaking

Vehicles, automobiles
Catalytic converter, in automobiles
Autogas converter, part of an automotive LPG system, also known as a vaporiser or pressure reducer

Other uses
Torque converter, a fluid coupling to transfer torque
Fountain pen converter, a removable filling mechanism for fountain pens
Unit converter, for converting between different units of measurement
Converters (industry), companies that create end products from rolls of raw material

See also
Conversion (disambiguation)
Adapter (disambiguation)